Poughkeepsie, officially the City of Poughkeepsie, separate from the Town of Poughkeepsie around it) is a city in the U.S. state of New York. It is the county seat of Dutchess County, with a 2020 census population of 31,577. Poughkeepsie is in the Hudson River Valley region, midway between the core of the New York metropolitan area and the state capital of Albany. It is a principal city of the Poughkeepsie–Newburgh–Middletown metropolitan area which belongs to the New York combined statistical area. It is served by the nearby Hudson Valley Regional Airport and Stewart International Airport in Orange County, New York.

Poughkeepsie has been called "The Queen City of the Hudson". It was settled in the 17th century by the Dutch and became New York State's second capital shortly after the American Revolution. It was chartered as a city in 1854. Major bridges in the city include the Walkway over the Hudson, a former railroad bridge called the Poughkeepsie Bridge which reopened as a public walkway on October 3, 2009; and the Mid-Hudson Bridge, a major thoroughfare built in 1930 that carries U.S. Route 44 over the Hudson. The city of Poughkeepsie lies in New York's 18th congressional district.

The City of Poughkeepsie and neighboring Town of Poughkeepsie are generally viewed as a single place and are commonly referred to collectively as "Poughkeepsie", with a combined population of 74,751 in 2018.

Poughkeepsie is situated between the Lower Hudson and the Capital District regions, and the city's economy is stimulated by several major corporations, including IBM. Educational institutions include Marist College, Vassar College, Dutchess Community College and The Culinary Institute of America.

Etymology 

History
English colonist Robert Sanders and Dutch colonist Myndert Harmense Van Den Bogaerdt acquired the land from a local Native American tribe in 1686, and the first settlers were the families of Barent Baltus Van Kleeck and Hendrick Jans van Oosterom. The settlement grew quickly, and the Reformed Church of Poughkeepsie was established by 1720.

The community was set off from the town of Poughkeepsie when it became an incorporated village on March 27, 1799. The city of Poughkeepsie was chartered on March 28, 1854. 

The city of Poughkeepsie was spared from battle during the American Revolutionary War and became the second capital of the State of New York after Kingston was burned by the British. In 1788, the Ratification Convention for New York State included Alexander Hamilton, John Jay, and George Clinton. They assembled at the courthouse on Market Street and ratified the United States Constitution, and New York State entered the new union as the eleventh of the original Thirteen Colonies to become the United States. In 1799, a new seal was created for the city.

Poughkeepsie was a major center for whale rendering, and the industry flourished during the 19th century through shipping, millineries, paper mills, and several breweries along the Hudson River, including some owned by Matthew Vassar, founder of Vassar College. Families built palatial weekend homes nearby, such as the Astors, Rogers, and Vanderbilts, due to the area's natural beauty and proximity to New York City. The Vanderbilt Mansion is located several miles up the Hudson from Poughkeepsie in the town of Hyde Park and is registered as a national historic site; it is considered to be a sterling example of the mansions built by American industrialists during the late 19th century. The city is home to the Bardavon 1869 Opera House, the oldest continuously operating entertainment venue in the state.

Geography

The city of Poughkeepsie is located on the western edge of Dutchess County, in Downstate New York's Hudson River Valley Area.

It is bordered by the town of Lloyd across the Hudson River to the west and by the town of Poughkeepsie on the north, east and south. There are two crossings of the Hudson River in Poughkeepsie: the Mid-Hudson Bridge for motor vehicles and pedestrians, and the pedestrian Walkway over the Hudson.

Its lowest is on the Hudson River.

Poughkeepsie makes up a part of the Poughkeepsie—Newburgh—Middletown metropolitan statistical area, which is a part of the wider NY-NJ-CT combined statistical area.

Historic districts 

Academy Street Historic District
Balding Avenue Historic District
Dwight-Hooker Avenue Historic District
Garfield Place Historic District
Mill Street-North Clover Street Historic District
Mount Carmel District
Union Street Historic District

Climate
Poughkeepsie has a humid continental climate (Köppen Dfa) with relatively hot summers and cold winters. Due to its inland location, Poughkeepsie can be very cold during the winter, with temperatures dropping below  a few times per year. Poughkeepsie can also be hit by powerful nor'easters, but it usually receives significantly less snow or rain from these storms compared to locations towards the south and east.

Demographics

The American Community Survey's 2018 estimates placed the population at 30,356. There were 14,240 housing units. 39.8% of Poughkeepsans were non-Hispanic white, 36.4% were Black or African American, 0.2% American Indian or Alaska Native, 1.2% Asian American, 5.0% multiracial, and 0.3% from some other race. An estimated 15 persons were of Pacific Islander heritage according to 2018's estimates. Hispanic and Latin Americans collectively made up 17.1% of the city's inhabitants. Mexican Americans and Puerto Ricans made the two largest groups of Hispanic and Latin Americans in the city, followed by Cubans and others.

In 2018, there were 12,627 households, out of which 19.8% had children under the age of 6 living in them. 56.1% of households has children from 6 to 17 living with them. 14.0% of householders aged 65 and older lived alone. The average household size was 2.33. A total of 6,606 families lived within the city of Poughkeepsie and the average family size was 3.21.

The median household income from 2014 to 2018 was $42,296 and the mean income was $60,763.

At the 2010 census there were 32,736 people. The population density was 5,806.2 inhabitants per square mile (2,243.8/km2). There were 13,153 housing units at an average density of 2,556.6 per square mile (988.0/km2). The racial makeup of the city was 52.8% White, 35.7% Black or African American, 10.6% Hispanic or Latino of any race, 1.6% Asian, 0.4% Native American, 5.3% from other races, and 4.1% from two or more races.

There were 12,014 households, out of which 28.3% had children under the age of 18 living with them, 29.8% were married couples living together, 19.7% had a female householder with no husband present, and 45.4% were non-families. 35.4% of all households were made up of individuals, and 13.2% had someone living alone who was 65 years of age or older. The average household size was 2.40 and the average family size was 3.15.

In the city, the population was spread out, with 25.9% under the age of 18, 12.2% from 18 to 24, 29.2% from 25 to 44, 19.0% from 45 to 64, and 13.6% who were 65 years of age or older. The median age was 33 years. For every 100 females, there were 91.7 males. For every 100 females age 18 and over, there were 88.0 males.

The median household income in the city was $29,389, and the median income for a family was $35,779. Males had a median income of $31,956 versus $25,711 for females. The per capita income for the city was $16,759. About 18.4% of families and 22.7% of the population were below the poverty line, including 30.3% of those under age 18 and 13.8% of those age 65 or over.

Religion 
Per Sperling's BestPlaces, nearly 54% of Poughkeepsie and its surrounding area have religious affiliation. The largest Christian organization is the Catholic Church (37.8%), served by the Latin Church-based Archdiocese of New York. The second and third largest Christian organizations are Methodism (2.6%) and Presbyterianism (2.0%), and third, Anglicanism/Episcopalianism (1.7%). Anglicans or Episcopalians within the city limits and surrounding area are primarily served by the Episcopal Diocese of New York.

The fifth largest Christian group is Pentecostalism (1.3%), followed by Lutheranism (1.1%), the Baptist Church (0.9%), the Latter-Day Saints (0.3%), and Christians of other denominations including the Eastern Orthodox and United Church of Christ (2.7%). The second largest religious group outside of Christianity is Islam (2.4%). The Islamic community primarily identifies with Sunni Islam in the area. Following Islam, 0.8% of the population profess Judaism and 0.1% practice an eastern religion.

Economy

As of 2020, the dominant industries in Poughkeepsie are healthcare, retail, education, science and technology, finance, and manufacturing. Cricket Wireless, Stop & Shop, Best Buy, Barnes & Noble, Rite Aid, Dunkin', Marshalls, Boost Mobile, Metro by T-Mobile, Verizon Communications, M&T Bank, Chase Bank, Big Lots, ShopRite, and Charter Communications are companies with a significant presence in the city and surrounding area.

IBM has a large campus in the adjacent town of Poughkeepsie. It was once referred to as IBM's "Main Plant", although much of the workforce has been moved elsewhere in the company (2008). The site once built the IBM 700/7000 series of computers as well as the IBM 7030 Stretch computer and later, together with the Endicott site, IBM mainframes. The RS/6000 SP2 family of computers, which came to fame after one of them won a chess match against world chess master Garry Kasparov, were also manufactured by IBM Poughkeepsie. In October 2008, IBM's Poughkeepsie facility was named "Assembly Plant of the Year 2008" by the editors of Assembly Magazine. Poughkeepsie remains IBM's primary design and manufacturing center for its newest mainframes and high-end Power Systems servers, and it is also one of IBM's major software development centers for z/OS and for other products.

Until 1972, Poughkeepsie was home to the Smith Brothers cough drop factory. The Smith Brothers' gravesite is in the Poughkeepsie Rural Cemetery.

Media

Poughkeepsie and Dutchess County are within the media market of the New York—New Jersey—Connecticut combined statistical area, though the city is headquarters for The Poughkeepsie Journal, the third-oldest active newspaper in the United States. Poughkeepsie Journal is owned by USA Today. News 12 Hudson Valley is a regional television channel targeting the Poughkeepsie and the Hudson Valley region.

FM radio stations in the area are: 

WRRV-96.9 (alternative rock)
WPDH-101.5 (album-oriented rock)
WRHV-88.7 (classical music, and NPR affiliate)
WCZX-97.7 (country)
WKXP-94.3 (soft adult contemporary)
WRWD-FM-107.3 (country)
WSPK-104.7 (top 40)
WHUD-100.7 (adult contemporary)
WDST-100.1 (independent rock)
WPKF-96.1 (rhythmic top 40)
WVKR-91.3 (Vassar College Radio)
WRNQ-92.1 ('80s to current music)

AM radio stations in the area are:

WEOK-1390 (oldies)
WGNY-1220 (sports)
WHVW-950 ('50s and older blues and country)
WKIP-1450 (talk radio)

Education

The Poughkeepsie City School District is the public K–12 school system, serving approximately 5,000 students.

The Oakwood Friends School is a co-ed boarding and day school serving approximately 170 students, grades 5–12. Oakwood was founded on the Quaker principles of Simplicity, Peace, Integrity, Community, Equality, and Stewardship. The school's vibrant community nurtures the spirit, scholar, artist, and athlete in each student. Poughkeepsie Day School, also outside the city, is a progressive co-ed pre-K-through-12 day school serving approximately 140 students, founded in 1934 by local families and members of the Vassar College faculty. Other private schools in the area include Tabernacle Christian Academy and Our Lady of Lourdes High School.

Spackenkill Union Free School District, comprising generally the southern part of the town of Poughkeepsie, consists of Hagan Elementary School, Nassau Elementary School, Orville A. Todd Middle School, and Spackenkill High School.

Colleges and universities

Three institutions of higher learning operate campuses within the city: Adelphi University's Hudson Valley Center, Marish College Marist College and the Ridley-Lowell Business and Technical Institute.

The Culinary Institute of America's main campus is located in the suburb of Hyde Park, north of the city of Poughkeepsie. Dutchess Community College, Marist College, and Vassar College are all located in the surrounding Town of Poughkeepsie.

Public safety

Fire
The city is protected by the career firefighters in the City of Poughkeepsie Fire Department. By keeping buildings up to code, controlling illegal occupancies, monitoring the safety of living areas and issuing licenses and permits, the department works to limit the potential for dangerous situations and the occurrences of fire hazards. The Poughkeepsie Fire Department operates out of three fire stations, located throughout the city, and operates and maintains a fire apparatus fleet of four engines, including one reserve engine; two ladder trucks; one rescue vehicle, cross-staffed as needed; and one fireboat. The Arlington Fire District, Fairview Fire District, and New Hamburg Fire Department cover the surrounding town of Poughkeepsie. The Fire Department is capable of handling fires, rescues, extractions and natural disasters. It is a certified Emergency Medical Services first responder fire department and first responder to calls with Mobile Life Support Services.

Police
Police protection to the city is provided by the City of Poughkeepsie Police Department. The police department has over 125 employees, including 96 sworn police officers and 34 civilians, of which 13 are emergency dispatchers. The Police Department also operate a Citizen Observer Alert Network to keep citizens informed about local crime, emergency situations, and other important information. The Dutchess County Sheriff Station is based in Poughkeepsie and is adjacent to the Dutchess County Jail, which houses around 250 inmates maximum capacity at any time, with the same number of inmates housed at out-of-county facilities.

Medical
Poughkeepsie is home to Vassar Brothers Medical Center, a 365-bed hospital situated next to U.S. Route 9 on Reade Place. The hospital has an advanced birthing center and a Level III Neonatal Intensive Care Unit. Vassar Brother Medical Center is owned and operated by Nuvance Health (formerly HealthQuest), a local nonprofit collection of hospitals and healthcare providers.

Emergency medical services are provided by Mobile Life Support Services, which are contracted to provide full-time ambulance coverage to the city. They provide paramedic level service, including advanced life support, and have ambulances stationed in the city on Pershing Avenue. Mobile Life also has a staff of specially trained paramedics that provide tactical Emergency Medical Services support to the city police during ESU/SWAT operations, as well as emergency responses for the Fire Department via their Special Operations Response Team. They also provide advanced life support ambulance service to other agencies and municipalities in Dutchess, Ulster, and Orange counties, and their headquarters building is located in New Windsor in Orange County.

Culture

Sports
The Hudson Valley Renegades is a minor league baseball team affiliated with the New York Yankees. The team is a member of the High-A East, and play at Dutchess Stadium in the nearby town of Fishkill.

The Hudson Valley Hawks were a team in the National Professional Basketball League until 2009 when the league disbanded.

The Hudson Valley Highlanders of the North American Football League played their home games at Dietz Stadium in nearby Kingston.

Poughkeepsie hosted a founding member of the North Eastern Hockey League with the formation of the Poughkeepsie Panthers in 2003. However, due to financial problems, the team only played for one season and became the Connecticut Cougars the following year. The league folded due to financial problems in January 2008. Subsequently, the city was home to the Hudson Valley Bears, one of four founding members of the Eastern Professional Hockey League, for one season. Both teams played their home games at the McCann Ice Arena in the Mid-Hudson Civic Center.

One of Poughkeepsie's most notable sports events was the annual Poughkeepsie Regatta of the Intercollegiate Rowing Association, which was held on the Hudson River from 1895 to 1949. The top college teams would attend along with tens of thousands of spectators. Poughkeepsie was known as the rowing capital of the world. Spectators watched from the hills and bluffs overlooking the river and from chartered boats and trains that followed the races along the entire length of the course; which were longer than present-day races, with varsity eights rowing a  race. When the rowing association moved the regatta to other venues, the Mid-Hudson Rowing Association was formed to preserve rowing in the area. It successfully lobbied to preserve the regatta's facilities for use by area high schools and club rowing programs. As part of the 400th anniversary celebration of Henry Hudson's trip up the Hudson River a recreation of the regatta was held with Marist College Crew as its host. The events included a fireworks display, a large dinner, and the unveiling of the restored historic Cornell Boathouse, now property of Marist Crew. Historically accurate, the four mile long course started off Rogers Point in Hyde Park and ended about a mile south of the Poughkeepsie-Highland Railroad Bridge. Competitors included Marist, Vassar, Army, Penn, Navy, Syracuse, Columbia and Cornell. Notably this was the first time women's crew teams were allowed to participate in the historic Poughkeepsie Regatta.

Established British racing team Carlin Motorsport have chosen Poughkeepsie as their U.S. base whilst racing in Indy Lights.

Arts and entertainment

Poughkeepsie has a number of notable institutions for arts and entertainment. The Bardavon 1869 Opera House, located on Market Street just below Main Street, is a theater that has an array of music, drama, dance, and film events and is the home of the Hudson Valley Philharmonic.

The Mid-Hudson Civic Center, located down the street from the Bardavon 1869 Opera House, hosts concerts, professional wrestling and trade shows and has an ice rink next door for ice hockey. From July 1984 to August 5, 1986, the Civic Center was the location for filming WWF Championship Wrestling.

The Chance, located at 6 Crannell Street in downtown Poughkeepsie, hosts live rock concerts with local as well as major artists.

The collections of the Frances Lehman Loeb Art Center at Vassar College chart the history of art from antiquity to the present and comprise over 21,000 works, including paintings, sculptures, prints, and photographs.

The Barrett Art Center at 55 Noxon Street offers exhibits, classes, and lectures on the visual arts.

Locust Grove, the home of Samuel Morse and a National Historic Landmark, features paintings by Morse, as well as historically important examples of telegraph technology.

For shopping and movie theater entertainment, the Poughkeepsie Galleria is located in the town of Poughkeepsie, southeast of the hamlet of Crown Heights and north of Wappingers Falls. The mall, which opened in 1987, consists of two floors with 250 shops and restaurants. The Regal Cinemas theater has 16 screens. Current anchor stores within the mall include Macy's, J. C. Penney, Target, Best Buy, and H&M.

The Mid-Hudson Children's Museum is located at 75 North Water Street.

The Cunneen-Hackett Arts Center at 9 and 12 Vassar Street provides venues for music, dance and the visual arts.

Bananas Comedy Club is a comedy club that presents comedians such as Jim Norton, Rich Vos, Patrice O'Neal, and Nick DiPaolo. Jimmy Fallon started his career performing at the club.

Joseph Bertolozzi's Bridge Music is a sound-art installation on the Mid-Hudson Bridge.

The Chance Theater and Mid-Hudson Civic Center ranked #4 and 5, respectively, on a list of Poughkeepsie's most Instagrammed locations in 2016.

Library
The Poughkeepsie Public Library has a central branch on Market Street and a branch location on Boardman Road.

Transportation

Poughkeepsie sits at the junction of the north–south US 9 and east–west US 44 and NY 55 highways.

Rail commuter service to New York City is provided at the Poughkeepsie Metro-North station by the MTA's Metro-North Railroad. Poughkeepsie is the northern terminus of Metro-North's Hudson Line. Amtrak also serves the station, along the Hudson River south to New York City's Pennsylvania Station and north along the river to Albany-Rensselaer station and points further north and west. Amtrak trains serving Poughkeepsie are the Adirondack, Empire Service, Ethan Allen Express, Maple Leaf, and Lake Shore Limited.

The Mid-Hudson Bridge, opened in 1930, carries US 44 and NY 55 across the Hudson River from Poughkeepsie to Highland. The Poughkeepsie Bridge opened in 1889 to carry railroad traffic across the Hudson, the usage of the bridge came to an end when a 1974 fire damaged its decking. A local group (Walkway over the Hudson) raised the funds to convert the bridge into a unique linear park connecting rail-trails on both sides of the Hudson River. The Walkway Over The Hudson opened on October 3, 2009, coinciding with the 400th anniversary of Henry Hudson's first exploration of the river named for him. The bridge is now open for pedestrian and bicycle use and is a state historic park.

The Dutchess County Airport in nearby Wappinger services general aviation, although it once had scheduled air carrier service by Colonial Airlines in the 1950s and regional airline service by Command Airways and others in the 1960s–1980s.

Bus transit service is provided by Dutchess County Public Transit, operated by Dutchess County, which travels throughout Dutchess County and also serves as the main link to the Route 9 corridor, including Poughkeepsie Galleria and South Hills Mall.

Both services have a quasi-hub at the intersection of Main and Market streets, adjacent to the Mid-Hudson Civic Center and at the west end of the former pedestrian-only Main Mall (the mall was removed in 2001, with those blocks being restored back to traffic and to the name Main Street). Other buses serving this area include Adirondack Trailways, Short Line, commuter runs to White Plains, and a shuttle to New Paltz.

Notable people

George Appo, pickpocket and con artist: operated in a green goods scam in Poughkeepsie for a short period in the 19th century
George G. Barnard, state judge impeached by the Court for the Trial of Impeachments for events during the Erie War
Chris Bell, film director and producer
Joseph Bertolozzi, composer, musician, and creator of Bridge Music and Tower Music projects
Josh Billings, pen name of Henry Wheeler Shaw, humorist of mid-to-late 19th century
Jane Bolin, the first black woman to serve as a judge in the United States
Rob Chianelli, drummer for We Are the In Crowd
Shawn Christensen, Oscar-winning screenwriter, film director, singer-songwriter, actor and painter
Richard Connell, author
Philip Schuyler Crooke (1810–1881), was a U.S. Representative
Andrew Jackson Davis (1826–1920), known variously as the "Poughkeepsie Seer" or "The Seer of Poughkeepsie"
Cathy Davis, boxer
Amanda Minnie Douglas (1831–1916), writer
Bill Duke, actor and film director
Chris Dyson, racecar driver
Martin Faust, actor
Kendall Francois, serial killer
Carolyn Garcia, a/k/a "Mountain Girl", Merry Prankster, wife of Grateful Dead guitarist Jerry Garcia
Benjamin A. Gilman, former U.S. congressman
Alex Goot, YouTube musician
Against The Current (band), pop/rock musicians with Chrissy Costanza as their lead singer
Dustin Higgs, convicted murderer executed by the United States federal government
Mela Hudson, actress, producer
Jonathan Idema, self-proclaimed counter-terrorism expert and covert operations specialist, partially served sentence in Pul-e-Charkhi prison in Afghanistan before being pardoned by Hamid Karzai
Tibor Kalman, graphic designer, emigrated from Hungary to Poughkeepsie as a child
Hevad Khan, poker player
G. Gordon Liddy, key figure in Watergate scandal
Keith Lockhart, conductor of Boston Pops Orchestra
Bartlett Marshall Low, Minnesota state legislator and businessman
Terry MacAlmon, Christian musician
Jocko Maggiacomo, race car driver
Joe McPhee, jazz multi-instrumentalist
Johnny Miller, pioneering aviator, brother of Lee Miller
Lee Miller, fashion model, photographer and World War II correspondent, sister of Johnny Miller
Alison Mountz, political geographer
Sergio Rossetti Morosini, artist, conservator
Sterling Morrison, guitarist for the 1960s rock band The Velvet Underground
Anna Morton, Second Lady of the United States from 1889 to 1893
Billy Name, photographer, filmmaker, artist and Andy Warhol collaborator
Homer Augustus Nelson, lawyer, Representative, Secretary of State of New York and colonel in Union Army
Michelle Nijhuis, science journalist
Mark Parker, president and CEO of Nike, Inc.
Edmund Platt, former U.S. Representative
Dave Price, WNBC-TV Weatherman
William Radford (1814–1870), former U.S. Representative
Barbara Rhoades, film and television actress
Richard Rinaldi, NBA guard
Robert Sheckley, author, nominated for Hugo and Nebula awards
Leonard B. Smith, jazz cornetist and composer
Charles Spencer, professional football offensive tackle
Monty Stickles, AFL and NFL football player
Debi Thomas, figure skater, 1986 world champion and 1988 Olympic bronze medalist
Matthew Vassar, founded Vassar College in 1861
Riley Weston, screenwriter best known for her work on Felicity
Andre Williams, NFL running back, 2013 Heisman Trophy finalist
Ed Wood, film director
Cory Wong, musician

Scientists and inventors

Sara Josephine Baker, physician, inventor of infant formula
William Henry Brewer, chemist, geologist and botanist
Alfred Mosher Butts, architect and inventor of board game Scrabble
Donald Klein, chemist and inventor of MOSFET transistor
Calvin D. MacCracken, inventor
Harold J. Morowitz, biophysicist
Samuel Morse, Morse code
Samuel Slocum, inventor
William Wallace Smith 2nd, chemist: first cough drops produced and advertised in the United States

Major League Baseball players

Frank Bahret
Tommy Boggs 
Buttons Briggs 
Frank Cimorelli
Bill Daley
Ricky Horton
Fred Lasher
Mickey McDermott 
Jeff Pierce
Elmer Steele

Bands

Genghis Tron (grindcore metal)
Matchbook Romance (emo punk)
Pound (rock)
Shai Hulud (hardcore metal)
That's Outrageous! (metalcore)
We Are the In Crowd (pop punk)
Against the Current (pop rock)

See also

 List of newspapers in New York in the 18th century: Poughkeepsie
 National Register of Historic Places listings in Poughkeepsie, New York
 Thomas Dongan, 2nd Earl of Limerick

References

Notes

Further reading
Flad, Harvey. 2005. A digital tour of Poughkeepsie. Poughkeepsie, NY: Vassar College.
Flad, Harvey K. and Griffen, Clyde. Main Street to Mainframes: Landscape and Social Change in Poughkeepsie. SUNY Press, 2009. 
Mano, Jo Margert and Linda Greenow. 2006. "Mexico comes to Main Street: Mexican immigration and urban revitalization in Poughkeepsie, NY". Middle States Geographer 39: 76–83.
Gottlock, Barbara and Wesley. 2011. "Lost Amusement Parks of the Hudson Valley". Blurb Publishing: p. 53-78.

External links

City of Poughkeepsie official website

 
Cities in New York (state)
Populated places established in 1687
New York
New York (state) populated places on the Hudson River
County seats in New York (state)
Poughkeepsie–Newburgh–Middletown metropolitan area
1687 establishments in the Province of New York
Cities in the New York metropolitan area
Cities in Dutchess County, New York
New York placenames of Native American origin